Omphisa caustalis is a moth in the family Crambidae. It was described by George Hampson in 1913. It is found in the Democratic Republic of the Congo (North Kivu) and Uganda.

References

Moths described in 1913
Spilomelinae